Agustín Emanuel Pastoriza Cacabelos, commonly known as Pibe (born 31 January 1996), is an Argentine professional footballer who plays for Spanish club Arenteiro as a winger.

Club career
Born in Adrogué, Pibe moved to Spain in 2002, aged five. He played youth football for Pontevedra CF, and made his senior debuts with the reserves in the regional leagues. On 17 March 2013 he made his first-team debut, playing an entire half in a 1–1 home draw against UD Barbadás.

In June, Pibe joined Real Betis, being initially assigned to the Juvenil squad. He appeared in his first official game with the Andalusians' main squad on 18 May 2014, coming on as a second-half substitute in 1–2 La Liga loss at CA Osasuna.

On 5 January 2016, after being rarely used at Real Betis B, Pibe moved to another reserve team, Real Oviedo Vetusta in Tercera División. On 11 August, he signed for Segunda División B side Coruxo FC.

Pibe returned to his first club Pontevedra on 25 January 2018.

In January 2021, Pibe signed for Inter Turku in Finland.

On 10 January 2022, he returned to Spain and signed with Arenteiro.

References

External links

Beticopedia profile 

1996 births
Living people
Argentine footballers
Association football wingers
La Liga players
Segunda División B players
Tercera División players
Pontevedra CF footballers
Real Betis players
Betis Deportivo Balompié footballers
Real Oviedo Vetusta players
Coruxo FC players
FC Inter Turku players
Veikkausliiga players
Argentine expatriate footballers
Argentine expatriate sportspeople in Spain
Expatriate footballers in Spain
Argentine expatriate sportspeople in Finland
Expatriate footballers in Finland
People from Adrogué
Sportspeople from Buenos Aires Province
Burgos CF Promesas players
CD Arenteiro players